Accession refers to the general idea of joining or adding to. It may also refer to:

Accession (property law)
 Accession, the act of joining a treaty by a party that did not take part in its negotiations; see Vienna Convention on the Law of Treaties#Signature, ratification and accession
 Ratification
 EU Accession 
 Accession to the throne; not to be confused with the later ceremony of Coronation
 Enthronement
 Accession day, when an heir becomes monarch, and its anniversary 
 Accession to elected office; inauguration
 Accession number (disambiguation)
 Accession number (cultural property), a catalogue number assigned to an object when it becomes part of a library or museum collection
 Accession number (bioinformatics), a unique identifier given to a biological polymer sequence (DNA, protein) when it is submitted to a sequence database
 Accession (Star Trek: Deep Space Nine)
 Accession Records, a record label created by Adrian Hates
 Instrument of Accession, a legal document introduced in 1935, used in 1947 to enable the rulers of the princely states formerly in British India to join India or Pakistan
 Instrument of Accession (Jammu and Kashmir), by which that state joined the Dominion of India (1947)
 Accession Day (Jammu and Kashmir), a public holiday